Dipterocarpus pachyphyllus is a tree in the family Dipterocarpaceae. The specific epithet pachyphyllus means "thick leaves".

Description
Its bark is chocolate-brown.

Distribution and habitat
Dipterocarpus pachyphyllus is endemic to Borneo. Its habitat is mixed dipterocarp forests and hilly land to  altitude.

Conservation
Dipterocarpus pachyphyllus has been assessed as vulnerable on the IUCN Red List. The species is threatened by logging and land conversion. In Kalimantan, forest fires are a threat.

References

pachyphyllus
Endemic flora of Borneo
Trees of Borneo
Plants described in 1963
Flora of the Borneo lowland rain forests